Alireza Ghashghaean is a retired Iranian football player.

Club career
He played for Bargh Shiraz F.C., Falu BS and Trollhättans FK (Sweden).

International career
He played for the Iran national football team and participated at the 1978 FIFA World Cup as a member of the squad.

References
Planet World Cup
RSSSF
Team Melli profile

1954 births
Living people
Iranian footballers
1978 FIFA World Cup players
Iran international footballers
Bargh Shiraz players
Association football defenders
People from Shiraz
Sportspeople from Fars province